Carl Messere is a former American football player and coach.  He was the fourteenth head football coach at Appalachian State University, serving from 1965 to 1970.

Head coaching record

References

1930s births
Living people
American football centers
Appalachian State Mountaineers football coaches
Appalachian State Mountaineers football players